The 1944–45 Arkansas Razorbacks men's basketball team represented the University of Arkansas in the 1944–45 college basketball season. The Razorbacks played their home games in the Men's Gymnasium in Fayetteville, Arkansas. It was former Razorback All-American Eugene Lambert's third season as head coach of the Hogs. The Razorbacks finished second in the Southwest Conference standings with a record of 9–3 and 17–9 overall.

Arkansas received a bid to the NCAA tournament, its second appearance in the tournament overall after not being able to participate the year before due to a serious car crash that killed a staff member, Everett Norris, and injured two starters, Deno Nichols and Ben Jones. Arkansas beat Oregon in the first round of the tournament to advance to its second Final Four in as many tournament appearances before losing to eventual champion Oklahoma A&M in the two clubs' fourth meeting of the season.

Center George Kok was named First Team All-SWC for the season.

Roster
Roster retrieved from HogStats.com.

Schedule and Results
Schedule retrieved from HogStats.com.

|-
!colspan=12 style=|Regular season

|-
!colspan=12 style=|  NCAA Tournament

References

Arkansas Razorbacks
Arkansas Razorbacks men's basketball seasons
Arkansas
NCAA Division I men's basketball tournament Final Four seasons